Dugerjav Peak is the rocky peak rising to 1208 m in the southeast foothills of Forbidden Plateau on Oscar II Coast in Graham Land.  It surmounts Paspal Glacier to the northeast and Green Glacier to the south.  The feature is named after the pioneer of Mongolian Antarctic research Lhamsuren Dugerjav, geologist at St. Kliment Ohridski Base in 2010/11 and subsequent seasons.

Location
British mapping in 1980.

Maps

 British Antarctic Territory.  Scale 1:200000 topographic map.  DOS 610 Series, Sheet W 64 62.  Directorate of Overseas Surveys, Tolworth, UK, 1980.
 Antarctic Digital Database (ADD). Scale 1:250000 topographic map of Antarctica. Scientific Committee on Antarctic Research (SCAR), 1993–2016.

Notes

References
 Dugerjav Peak. SCAR Composite Antarctic Gazetteer.
 Bulgarian Antarctic Gazetteer. Antarctic Place-names Commission. (details in Bulgarian, basic data in English)

External links
 Dugerjav Peak. Copernix satellite image

Mountains of Graham Land
Oscar II Coast
Bulgaria and the Antarctic